Patricia Shipp Lieb (born 1942) is a female American poet, newspaper journalist and book author who writes poetry, fiction and non-fiction and has specialized in the crime-novel genre. She presently lives in the US state of Florida.

Early in her journalism career, she was honored for her "Reliable Reporting of Local Government News 1991-1999" by the Dunedin City Commission and for "Outstanding Dedication to Reliable and Impartial News Coverage" in 1996; in 1998 she was honored with the "Outstanding Achievement in Your Vocation" by the Rotary Club of Dunedin.

Biography

Education
Patricia Shipp Lieb was born in Texarkana, Arkansas. Upon completion of her high school studies, she entered Kankakee Community College in Kankakee, Illinois. She later transferred to Governors State University in University Park, Illinois.

Writing career
Lieb worked for the Daily Journal in Kankakee, as a feature writer. She co-founded Lieb-Schott Publications with Carol Schott (Martino); they edited and published a literary magazine, Pteranodon, which featured poets such as William Stafford, Richard Eberhart, Jared Carter, Glenn Swetman, David Chorlton, and writers such as Patrick Smith and Borden Deal. They published books of poetry by other poets as well as compilations of their own works.

After moving to Florida, Lieb joined the news crew at the Daily Sun-Journal in Brooksville where she worked for four years as the newspaper's crime-beat reporter. She also wrote for true crime magazines for the next 10 years and later wrote Murders in the Swampland, the story of an actual murder.

Lieb last worked as a news and feature writer for the Suncoast News in New Port Richey where she won several awards from the Florida State Press Association, Kiwanis and Rotary Clubs, awards from the City of Dunedin, and various awards for features and photography.

Lieb has two children; Douglas Lieb Jr., who lives in Middleboro, Massachusetts; and Rachelle Lieb Strenge, who lives in Spring Hill, Florida. Her step-parents are deceased.

Bibliography

 Transparent Jeans: Poems. (A Pteranodon chapbook) Lieb-Schott Publications, 1980.
Catholics and Publics. (poems, with foreword by poet Jared Carter)1983.  
Captured. (A Pteranodon chapbook of poems) Lieb-Schott Publications, 1983.
The Goat Ate My Notes: 2002 Bramble Street, Vol.1, 1st ed., CreateSpace Independent Publishing Platform, 2015. 
Across the Red River to Her Mysterious Heritage. ZXlibris Corp, 2003. 
Confessions of a High-Priced Call Girl. (co-author) 1st ed., BookSurge Publishing, 2006.  
Blue Eyes. Asylett Press, 2007. 
Murders in the Swampland. Asylett Press, 2008. 
Bridged By Love. Asylett Press, 2009. 
Sex, Games & Death. Kindle Edition, 2012 ASIN B008I79LAC
Saying I Love You. Asylett Press, 2012.  
How I Met My Husband, by Michele Stegman. (contributing author; Lumps in the mattress) eBook and Kindle Edition, 2012. ASIN B008RE1RJO
Kid Killers. (Florida Killers) Kindle Edition, 2012. ASIN B008RXW27Q 
Florida Serial Killers. Kindle Edition, 2012. ASIN B0085XMI1S 
Innocent Until Proven Guilty. Kindle Edition, 2013. ASIN B00DII18JS 
The Adventures of a Squirrel Named Peanut. CreateSpace Independent Publishing Platform, 2013. 
Blue Eyes Haunting. Kindle Edition, 2013. ASIN B008G0J80E
My 18th Birthday. Kindle Edition, 2014. ASIN B00Q4ZGMSE 
Among My Souvenirs. CreateSpace Independent Publishing Platform, 2014.  
Sundown:Poems from the Deep: paranormal poems. Kindle Edition, 2015. ASIN B019YBJZH4

References

1942 births
Living people
21st-century American novelists
20th-century American poets
American women novelists
Governors State University alumni
People from Texarkana, Arkansas
Writers from Arkansas
Novelists from Florida
Novelists from Illinois
American women journalists
American women poets
21st-century American poets
American crime fiction writers
20th-century American women writers
21st-century American women writers
Women crime fiction writers
20th-century American novelists
20th-century American journalists
21st-century American non-fiction writers